Chris Mattmann (born October 29, 1980) is an American data scientist currently working as the Principal Data Scientist and Chief Technology and Innovation Officer in the Office of the Chief Information Officer (OCIO) at the NASA Jet Propulsion Laboratory (JPL) in Pasadena, California. He is also the manager of JPL's Open Source Applications office. Mattmann was formerly Chief Architect in the Instrument and Data Systems section at the laboratory.

Mattmann graduated from the University of Southern California (USC) in 2007 with a PhD in Computer Science studying with Dr. Nenad Medvidović and he went on to invent Apache Tika with Jérôme Charron. Apache Tika is a widely used software framework for content detection and analysis. Mattmann later wrote a book about the framework titled Tika in Action with Jukka Zitting, which is published by Manning Publications.

Chris Mattmann's work on Tika and other projects was heavily influenced by open source both at NASA and within the academic community. After creating Tika, and helping to create other projects including Apache Nutch an open source web crawler and the predecessor to the big data platform Apache Hadoop, in May 2013 Mattmann joined the  Board of Directors at the Apache Software Foundation where he served until March 2018 and held roles including Treasurer, Vice Chairman, and Vice President of the Legal Affairs Committee.

During this time, Chris worked to apply open source principles to data management problems inspired by his work at NASA in Earth and Planetary science, and in engineering. Mattmann maintained an affiliation with USC as an Adjunct Associate Professor and in order to continue to do research on open source and data management, he created the Information Retrieval and Data Science Group (IRDS). IRDS includes diverse students in the areas of data science, information retrieval and informatics and the group exists within USC's Viterbi School of Engineering. The focus of the group is on cross disciplinary data and content analysis work applied to the science, business, engineering and information technology (IT) domains.

At NASA, Mattmann's work has been applied to a number of space missions including Orbiting Carbon Observatory 1/2, NPP Sounder PEATE, and the Soil Moisture Active Passive (SMAP) Earth science missions. Mattmann was also one of the principal developers of the Object Oriented Data Technology platform, an open source data management system framework originally developed by NASA JPL and then donated to the Apache Software Foundation.

More recently, Chris has been focused on Dark Web and automated data processing technologies and has been leading research teams working with DARPA and NASA JPL on the Memex project. This project involves data discovery and dissemination from the Dark Web.

References

Living people
1980 births
NASA people
USC Viterbi School of Engineering alumni
American scientists
21st-century American engineers
American computer programmers
Jet Propulsion Laboratory
American aerospace engineers
Computer science writers
University of Southern California faculty
People from Santa Clarita, California